A referendum on the retrospective disclosure of the financial details of large-scale privatisation was held in Slovakia on 22 October 1994. Although approved by 95.9% of those voting, voter turnout was just 20% and the referendum was declared invalid due to insufficient turnout.

Question

("Do you agree to a law on proof of funds used for auctioning and privatization?")

Results

References

1994 referendums
Referendums in Slovakia
1994 in Slovakia
October 1994 events in Europe